Eric Welsh (born 1 May 1942) is a Northern Irish former professional footballer who played as a right winger.

Career
Born in Belfast, Welsh played for Boyland, Exeter City, Carlisle United, Torquay United, Hartlepool United, Port Elizabeth City, Salisbury, Hellenic and Distillery. He also earned four caps for the Northern Ireland national team.

References

External links

1942 births
Living people
Association footballers from Northern Ireland
Northern Ireland international footballers
Exeter City F.C. players
Carlisle United F.C. players
Torquay United F.C. players
Hartlepool United F.C. players
Hellenic F.C. players
Lisburn Distillery F.C. players
English Football League players
NIFL Premiership players
Association football wingers
Expatriate association footballers from Northern Ireland
Expatriate footballers in England
Expatriate soccer players in South Africa
Expatriate sportspeople from Northern Ireland in South Africa